Kevin Harris may refer to:

Kevin Harris (American football) (born 2000), American football running back
Kevin Harris (politician), member of the Maryland House of Delegates
Kevin Harris (Ruby Ridge), participant in the 1992 siege in Idaho
Kevin Harris, character in The Haunting of Hill House (TV series)

See also
Kevon Harris (disambiguation)
Calvin Harris (born 1984), Scottish DJ